The 18th Marine Regiment was a composite engineer regiment of the United States Marine Corps subordinate to the 2nd Marine Division.  It was disbanded during the war, with the 1st and 2nd battalions remaining in the Division.

Subordinate units
The regiment was a composite of three different types of battalions and a headquarters and service company:

 1st Battalion, A, B, & C Companies  2nd Engineer Battalion, now 2nd Combat Engineer Battalion
 2nd Battalion, D, E, & F Companies  2nd Pioneer Battalion, now 2nd Landing Support Battalion
 3rd Battalion, G, H, & I Companies  18th Naval Construction Battalion, now Naval Mobile Construction Battalion 18 or NMCB 18

History

World War II

18th Marines was activated on 8 September 1942 and participated in actions at Tarawa, Saipan and Tinian. It was inactivated on 16 August 1944.

On Tinian there were two small beaches on the North end where an assault landing could be made with low coral ledges.  The rest of the island had coral cliffs up to 15 feet in height at the waters edge negating any assault plans.  However, the Marine Corps asked the Seabees if they could come up with an idea to get over the coral.  Commodore Paul J. Halloran (CEC) CB theater commander provided drawings of a conceptual landing ramp for the 18th and  121st CBs to fabricate.   They mounted steel beams salvaged from Saipan's abandoned sugar mill on LVT-2s to create a portable assault ramps. If they worked they would allow the Marines to outflank Tinian's prepared defenses.  The Marine Generals was skeptical and ordered that the ramps be put through a 100 vehicle use tests.   The Seabee creation was named a Doodlebug.   It worked exactly as the Marines had hoped.

Commanders
Colonel Elmer E. Hall: 8 September 1942
Colonel Ewart S. Laue: 31 August - 3 October 1943; 24–29 February 1944; 7–9 April 1944; 22–24 April 1944
Colonel Cyril W. Martyr: 4 October 1943 - 23 February 1944; 1 March - 6 April 1944; 25 June - 15 August 1944
LtCol Russell Lloyd: 10-14, 19-21, 25–30 April 1944; 1–11 May 1944; 1–24 June 1944

Unit awards

  Presidential Unit Citation with blue enamel star : – Tarawa

1st Battalion
Company A PUC 20-24Nov43 SU 2d MarDiv (REIN) 
Company B PUC 7Aug-9Dec42 SU 1st MarDiv
PUC 20-24Nov43 SU 2d MarDiv (REIN)
Company C PUC 20-24Nov43 SU 2d MarDiv (REIN)
2d Battalion
Company D PUC 7Aug-9Dec42 SU 1st MarDiv
PUC 20-24Nov43 SU 2d MarDiv (REIN)
Company E PUC 20-24Nov43 SU 2d MarDiv (REIN)
Company F PUC 20-24Nov43 SU 2d MarDiv (REIN)

See also

 History of the United States Marine Corps
 List of United States Marine Corps regiments
 Organization of the United States Marine Corps
 2nd Marine Division
 16th Marine Regiment(Engineer)
 17th Marine Regiment(Engineer)
 19th Marine Regiment(Engineer)
 20th Marine Regiment(Engineer)
 Seabees

References

External links

http://www.tarawaontheweb.org/leather.htm
http://www.ibiblio.net/hyperwar/USMC/USMC-M-Saipan/USMC-M-Saipan-IV.html
http://www.ibiblio.org/hyperwar/USMC/USMC-M-Tinian/USMC-M-Tinian-IV.html
http://www.ibiblio.org/hyperwar/USMC/USMC-M-Tarawa/USMC-M-Tarawa-H.html
https://www.ibiblio.org/hyperwar/USMC/USMC-M-Tarawa/index.html#index
http://www.seabeecook.com/history/NMCB_18.htm

Eng18
Eng18
United States Marine Corps in World War II
Military units and formations established in 1942
1942 establishments in the United States